The Canal des Landes, also Canal de Cazaux, is a canal in south western France, Aquitaine Region, connecting the Étang de Biscarrosse and the Étang de Cazaux to the Bassin d'Arcachon.

See also
 List of canals in France

References

Canals in France